Idrissa Adam (born 28 December 1984) is a Cameroonian sprinter who competes in the 100 metres and 200 metres.

His first international outing came at the African Junior Athletics Championships in 2003, where he was fifth in the 100 m final. He won his first continental level medal the following year, taking the bronze medal in the 4×100 metres relay at the 2004 African Championships in Athletics in a team including Joseph Batangdon. It was another four years before he won another major medal: at the 2008 African Championships he and Batangdon again claimed the relay bronze for Cameroon. He came fourth in that event at the 2009 Jeux de la Francophonie.

He represented Cameroon in the 100 and 200 m at both the 2010 African Championships in Athletics and the 2010 Commonwealth Games, but did not progress beyond the early rounds. He established himself as an individual runner at the 2011 All-Africa Games, where he ran a Cameroonian record of 10.14 seconds in the 100 m semi-finals (later finishing sixth) and was the surprise winner of the 200 m gold medal ahead of Ben Youssef Meité.

References

External links
 
 
 
 
 
 

1984 births
Living people
Cameroonian male sprinters
Olympic athletes of Cameroon
Athletes (track and field) at the 2012 Summer Olympics
Commonwealth Games competitors for Cameroon
Athletes (track and field) at the 2010 Commonwealth Games
Athletes (track and field) at the 2014 Commonwealth Games
World Athletics Championships athletes for Cameroon
African Games gold medalists for Cameroon
African Games medalists in athletics (track and field)
Athletes (track and field) at the 2011 All-Africa Games
20th-century Cameroonian people
21st-century Cameroonian people